Gadi Kinda (born 23 March 1994) is a professional footballer who plays as a midfielder for Major League Soccer club Sporting Kansas City. Born in Ethiopia, he represents the Israel national team.

Early life
Kinda was born in Addis Ababa, Ethiopia, to an Ethiopian-Jewish family. At the age of three, he immigrated to Israel with his family.

Club career
From the age of 17 he played for F.C. Ashdod in the Israeli Premier League and stayed with the club for 8 years.
In February 2019, he moved to Beitar Jerusalem.

In January 2020, Kinda joined Major League Soccer club Sporting Kansas City on a one-year loan deal with an option to buy. Following the 2020 season, Kinda was signed permanently by Sporting Kansas City.

International career
He made his debut for the senior Israel national team on 5 June 2021 in a friendly match against Montenegro. He substituted Manor Solomon in the 73rd minute and scored on his debut in extra time to establish a final score of 3–1 for Israel.

Honours
Beitar Jerusalem
Israeli Toto Cup: 2019–20

References

External links

1994 births
Living people
Sportspeople from Addis Ababa
Ethiopian Jews
Ethiopian emigrants to Israel
Citizens of Israel through Law of Return
Footballers from Ashdod
Israeli footballers
Association football midfielders
F.C. Ashdod players
Beitar Jerusalem F.C. players
Sporting Kansas City players
Israeli Premier League players
Liga Leumit players
Major League Soccer players
Israel youth international footballers
Israel under-21 international footballers
Israel international footballers
Israeli expatriate footballers
Israeli expatriate sportspeople in the United States
Expatriate soccer players in the United States
Jewish footballers
Jewish Israeli sportspeople
Israeli people of Ethiopian-Jewish descent
Sportspeople of Ethiopian descent